Takasago Station (高砂駅) is the name of multiple train stations in Japan:

 Takasago Station (Hokkaidō)
 Takasago Station (Hyōgo)
 Keisei-Takasago Station